Sherwood is a central suburb of Durban, KwaZulu-Natal, South Africa.

References

Suburbs of Durban